Misimians were a mountainous indigenous tribe in ancient Georgia. Along with the Sanigs they are thought of as the ancestors of the modern day Svan people, who constitute a subethnos of the Georgian people. They bordered the Apsilae tribe. According to Agathias Scholasticus both tribes were subjects of the Lazic king. Misimians are known for participating in Lazic War. Etymologically the name "Misimians" corresponds to the Svan self-designation  Mushüan. The Misimians occupied part of the Kodori gorge and, according to some Georgian authors, were "doubtlessly" a Svanian tribe. It follows, therefore, that Svans lived in the Kodori Gorge as early as in the Antiquity.

References

Ancient peoples of Georgia (country)
Tribes in Greco-Roman historiography
Sub-ethnic groups